In statistics, burstiness is the intermittent increases and decreases in activity or frequency of an event.
One of measures of burstiness is the Fano factor—a ratio between the variance and mean of counts.

Burstiness is observable in natural phenomena, such as natural disasters, or other phenomena, such as network/data/email network traffic or vehicular traffic. Burstiness is, in part, due to changes in the probability distribution of inter-event times. Distributions of bursty processes or events are characterised by heavy, or fat, tails.

Burstiness of inter-contact time between nodes in a time-varying network can decidedly slow spreading processes over the network. This is of great interest for studying the spread of information and disease.

Burstiness Score 

One relatively simple measure of burstiness is burstiness score. It is defined by

 

A positive score says that  occurs more often during subset  than over total time , making  a bursty period. A negative score implies otherwise.

See also
Burst transmission
Poisson clumping
Time-varying network

References

Markov processes
Applied statistics